Mochi is a Japanese rice cake made of glutinous rice pounded into paste and molded into shape.

Mochi may also refer to:

Food
Mochi rice, a synonym for glutinous rice
Mochi ice cream, a confection made from mochi rice and ice cream
Moche (food), also spelled mochi or muchi, a Filipino rice cake derived from Chinese-Filipino buchi (jian dui)

People
Mochi (Cheyenne) (c. 1841–1881), nineteenth-century Native American warrior
Mochi (Hindu), a Hindu caste found mainly in North India
Mochi (Muslim), a community in North India, Pakistan and Bangladesh
Mochi (Sikh), a community found mainly in the Punjab state of India
Mochi (surname), notable people with the surname

Other uses
Mochi (magazine), magazine and blog that aims to empower young Asian American women
Mochi Craft, a yacht building subsidiary of the Ferretti Group
Mochi Gate, a historical gate in Lahore, Pakistan
Mochi language, a dialect of Central Kilimanjaro language
Mochi Media, an advertising system and company for Adobe Flash
Mochi Pura, a locality located within union council 128 (Faisal Town) in Gulberg Tehsil of Lahore, Punjab, Pakistan
Uke Mochi, a goddess of food in the Shinto religion of Japan

See also 

 Mocchi (disambiguation)